Sahil Sandhu (born 5 January 1991) is a Canadian former professional soccer player who played as a defender.

Career

Early career
Born in Amritsar, Punjab in India, Sandhu started his career with the Vancouver Whitecaps FC Residency program after moving to Canada as a child. He was a part of the 2004 Whitecaps FC Residency team that won the Super Y-League. He scored the winning goal in the championship final against Schulz Academy. A couple years later, in 2007, Sandhu was awarded the B.C. Soccer Association Male Youth Player of the Year in 2007. In 2009, Sandhu was loaned out to the youth academy at Energie Cottbus. After spending time with Energie Cottbus, Sandhu played in the USL PDL with the Victoria Highlanders.

Sandhu eventually left the Whitecaps FC Residency and attended Douglas College where he went on to represent the Royals. While playing with the Royals, Sandhu also played for ICST Pegasus of the Vancouver Metro Soccer League where in 2014 he went to score twelve goals during the season.

Whitecaps 2
On 25 March 2015, Sandhu returned to the Whitecaps FC organization when he signed for Whitecaps FC 2, the Vancouver Whitecaps FC reserve team in the United Soccer League. He made his debut for the team four days later on 29 March 2015 against the Seattle Sounders FC 2. He came on as a 46th-minute substitute for Victor Blasco. In December 2016, Whitecaps FC 2 announced that Sandhu would not return to the club for the 2017 season.

International
Sandhu has represented Canada at the under-15 and under-17 levels.

Career statistics

References

External links 
 Profile at Vancouver Whitecaps FC official website

1991 births
Living people
Indian footballers
Sportspeople from Amritsar
Footballers from Punjab, India
Canadian soccer players
Vancouver Whitecaps FC U-23 players
Victoria Highlanders players
Whitecaps FC 2 players
Association football forwards
USL League Two players
USL Championship players
Canada men's youth international soccer players